Ted W. Daughtey is an American pulmonologist-immunologist specialized in sleeping and breathing disorders. He is the first gentleman of Kansas as the spouse of governor Laura Kelly.

Life 
Daughtey graduated from Baylor University. He earned a M.D. from the University of Texas Southwestern Medical Center and completed a residency at the Medical University of South Carolina. He conducted a fellowship at the University of California, San Francisco. 

Daughety worked for the National Jewish Hospital and Saint Joseph Hospital in Denver. He held various academic appointments with the San Francisco VA Medical Center and the University of Colorado Health Sciences Center. He married Laura Kelly in 1979. In 1986, he joined the Salina Clinic as a pulmonary specialist and immunologist. Daughety species in the diagnosis and treatment of breathing disorders including asthma and bronchitis. On February 1, 2019, Daughtey closed his outreach clinic at Neman Regional Health and resigned as the sleep disorder center medical director. He had retired as a pulmonologist in April 2020. During the COVID-19 pandemic in Kansas, he resumed work at a screening clinic.

On January 14, 2019, Daughtey became the third first gentleman of Kansas as the spouse of governor Laura Kelly. They moved into the Cedar Crest residence. Daughtey and Kelly have two daughters.

References 

Living people
Year of birth missing (living people)
Baylor University alumni
University of Texas Southwestern Medical Center alumni
University of Colorado faculty
First Ladies and Gentlemen of Kansas
20th-century American physicians
21st-century American physicians
American pulmonologists
American immunologists
Physicians from Kansas